Erik Kynard Jr. (born February 3, 1991) is an American track and field athlete who competes in the high jump. In his Olympic debut at the 2012 Summer Olympics in London as a 21-year-old, he won a silver medal in the men's high jump. His silver medal was upgraded to gold in 2021 with the disqualification of original champion Ivan Ukhov from Russia for doping.

Kynard was born in 1991, the son of Erik Kynard and Brandynn Adams. He is a 2009 graduate of Rogers High School in Toledo, Ohio, and a graduate of Kansas State University where he trains under Cliff Rovelto.  He jumps off his right leg.  
  
At the 2012 United States Olympic Trials, Kynard made the Olympic team by placing second behind Jamie Nieto with a height of 2.28 m. At the Olympics, Kynard won silver behind Russian Ivan Ukhov with a height of 2.33 m, the first major international medal of his career. Ukhov won the competition with a height of 2.38 m. Throughout the high jump competition, Kynard was noticed by his American-themed tube socks.

In February 2019, it was announced that all of Ivan Ukhov's results from  16 July 2012 to 31 December 2015 were being disqualified for doping, making Eric Kynard the rightful recipient of the 2012 gold medal.

At the start of the 2013 outdoor season, he cleared a world-leading mark of 2.34 m at the Mt SAC Relays. He won the high jump title at the United States Outdoor National Championships in 2014 and 2015: in the latter he tied his personal best, and the Meet record, of 2.37m (7' 9-1/4").

In January 2022, despite being retired, Kynard accepted a 6-month ban from the U.S. Anti-Doping Agency for receiving an IV infusion of saline solution with no prohibited substances without a therapeutic use exemption.

Major competition record

Personal bests

All information taken from IAAF profile.

References

External links
 
 
 
 
 
 
 Kansas State University bio: Erik Kynard Jr.
 

1991 births
Living people
American male high jumpers
African-American male track and field athletes
Athletes (track and field) at the 2012 Summer Olympics
Athletes (track and field) at the 2016 Summer Olympics
Olympic gold medalists for the United States in track and field
Medalists at the 2012 Summer Olympics
World Athletics Championships athletes for the United States
USA Indoor Track and Field Championships winners
Diamond League winners
USA Outdoor Track and Field Championships winners
Competitors at the 2011 Summer Universiade
21st-century African-American sportspeople